System D or Système D is a person's ability to adapt quickly and improvise to solve problems.

System D or systemd may also refer to:

 systemd, a computer startup system for Linux
 Système D, an album by Les Rita Mitsouko
 System-D, the Belgian DJ Jean-Philippe Chainiaux
 CCIR System D, an analog TV broadcast system used in mainland China and the former USSR

See also
 Black market